The European Cyclo-cross Championships are the European championships in cyclo-cross. They have been held since 2003 in November, towards the start of the cyclo-cross season. The championships are organised by the Union Européenne de Cyclisme and held for men under-23 and juniors and elite women. Since 2015 there also is an elite men's competition. Since 2013 there is a women's under-23 and since 2019 there is also a women's juniors competition.

Locations

Palmarès

Women

Elite women

Women under-23

Women juniors

Men

Men elite

Men under-23

Men juniors

External links 
 

 
European cycling championships
Cyclo-cross races